The 2022–23 CAF Champions League qualifying rounds began on 10 September 2022 and ended on 20 October 2022. A total of 58 teams competed in the qualifying rounds to decide the 16 places in the group stage of the 2022–23 CAF Champions League.

Times were local.

Draw

The draw for the qualifying rounds was held on 9 August 2022 at the CAF headquarters in Cairo, Egypt.

The entry round of the 58 teams entered into the draw was determined by their performances in the CAF competitions for the previous five seasons (CAF 5-Year Ranking points shown in parentheses).

Format

In the qualifying rounds, each tie was played on a home-and-away two-legged basis. If the aggregate score was tied after the second leg, the away goals rule was applied, and if still tied, extra time was not played, and the penalty shoot-out was used to determine the winner (Regulations III. 13 & 14).

Schedule
The schedule of the competition was as follows.

Bracket
The bracket of the draw was announced by the CAF on 9 August 2022.

The 16 winners of the second round advanced to the group stage, while the 16 losers of the second round entered the Confederation Cup play-off round.

First round
The first round, also called the first preliminary round, included the 52 teams that did not receive byes to the second round.

|}

Rivers United won 3–1 on aggregate.

Plateau United won 3–2 on aggregate.

ASN Nigelec won 2–1 on aggregate.

US Monastir won 3–1 on aggregate.

Vipers won 4–0 on aggregate.

La Passe won on walkover after Volcan Club failed to appear for the second leg.

ASEC Mimosas won 4–1 on aggregate.

ASKO Kara won 2–1 on aggregate.

JS Kabylie won 3–1 on aggregate.

CR Belouizdad won 3–0 on aggregate.

Young Africans won 9–0 on aggregate.

2–2 on aggregate. Al Hilal won on away goals.

Al Merrikh won 2–1 on aggregate.

Al Ahli Tripoli won 6–0 on aggregate.

2–2 on aggregate. Flambeau du Centre won on away goals.

Zamalek won 4–0 on aggregate.

Cape Town City won 2–0 on aggregate.

Petro de Luanda won 5–1 on aggregate.

1º de Agosto won 2–1 on aggregate.

Simba won 4–0 on aggregate.

Royal Leopards won 5–3 on aggregate.

Coton Sport won 4–0 on aggregate.

1–1 on aggregate. Rail Club du Kadiogo won 3–1 on penalties.

AS Vita Club won 3–2 on aggregate.

Second round
The second round, also called the second preliminary round, included 32 teams: the 6 teams that received byes to this round, and the 26 winners of the first round.

|}

Wydad AC won 7–2 on aggregate.

2–2 on aggregate. Espérance de Tunis won on away goals.

Raja CA won 3–0 on aggregate.

Al Ahly won 4–0 on aggregate.

0–0 on aggregate. Vipers won 4–2 on penalties.

Mamelodi Sundowns won 15–1 on aggregate

Horoya won 2–1 on aggregate.

JS Kabylie won 3–2 on aggregate.

 
CR Belouizdad won 3–2 on aggregate.

Al Hilal won 2–1 on aggregate.

3–3 on aggregate. Al Merrikh won on away goals.

Zamalek won 6–1 on aggregate.

Petro de Luanda won 4–0 on aggregate.

Simba won 4–1 on aggregate.

Coton Sport won 3–2 on aggregate.

0–0 on aggregate. AS Vita Club won 4–3 on penalties.

Notes

References

External links
Total CAF Champions League, CAFonline.com

1
September 2022 sports events in Africa
October 2022 sports events in Africa